Evelyn Cloupet (3 July 1900 – 25 November 1985) was a former French athlete of the 1920s and 1930s.

Biography  
Evelyn was the champion of France in the standing long jump and in the standing high jump at the 1926 French Athletics Championships, and was then  champion of France in the triathlon in 1930.

She participated in 1928 Summer Olympics, finishing fourteenth in the high jump.

References

External links  
 
 
 Evelyne Cloupet at Athle.com 

1900 births
1985 deaths
French female long jumpers
Athletes (track and field) at the 1928 Summer Olympics
Olympic athletes of France
People from Foix
Sportspeople from Ariège (department)
20th-century French women